Anja Althaus (born 3 September 1982) is a retired German handball player who most recently played for Győri Audi ETO KC and formerly was a member of the German national team. She won the Champions League three times in her career (twice with Viborg, once with Győr).

Althaus made her debut on the German team in 2002. She received a bronze medal at the 2007 World Championship. She competed at the 2008 Summer Olympics in Beijing, where Germany finished 11th.

She announced her retirement from professional handball after the Champions League final in 2017, where HC Vardar fell short to Győri ETO. She changed her mind and a few weeks later signed a contract with Győri ETO. She won the Champions League title, the Hungarian Championship and the Hungarian Cup as well and then she retired from handball in 2018 for good.

Honours
Bundesliga:
Winner: 2003, 2013
DHB-Pokal:
Winner: 2013
Damehåndboldligaen:
Winner: 2008, 2009, 2010
Landspokalturnering:
Winner: 2007, 2008
EHF Champions League:
Winner: 2009, 2010, 2018
Finalist: 2017

Individual awards
Best Defensive Player of the European Championship: 2012

References

External links 
 
 
 

1982 births
Living people
Sportspeople from Magdeburg
People from Bezirk Magdeburg
German female handball players
Olympic handball players of Germany
Handball players at the 2008 Summer Olympics
Viborg HK players
Expatriate handball players
German expatriate sportspeople in Denmark
German expatriate sportspeople in Hungary
Győri Audi ETO KC players
German expatriate sportspeople in North Macedonia
20th-century German women